Rudik, also rendered as Rudig, may refer to:
 Rudik-e Karim Bakhsh
 Rudik-e Mahmud-e Pain
 Rudik-e Molladad
 Rudik-e Sahebdad

 Vroutek (German: Rudig) a town in the Czech Republic